Pabrico (formerly, Pabrico Siding) is a neighborhood of Union City in Alameda County, California. It lies at an elevation of 52 feet (16 m). It was formerly an unincorporated community. Pabrico is named after Oakland Paving Brick Co. operated here from 1901 to 1912.

References

Neighborhoods in Newark, California